Chulpan (Sulpan) is a rural locality (a village) in Urshaksky Selsoviet, Aurgazinsky District, Bashkortostan, Russia. The population was 45 as of 2010.

Geography 
It is located 32 km from Tolbazy and 16 km from Staroabsalyamovo.

References 

Rural localities in Aurgazinsky District